Arundelpet is a neighborhood in Guntur of the Indian state of Andhra Pradesh. It is one of the commercial areas of the city.

References 

Neighbourhoods in Guntur